Skybound is the sixth season of the computer-animated television series Ninjago: Masters of Spinjitzu (titled Ninjago from the eleventh season onward). The series was created by Michael Hegner and Tommy Andreasen. The season aired from 24 March to 15 July 2016, following the fifth season titled Possession. It is succeeded by the television special Day of the Departed.

The sixth season introduces the Djinn pirate Nadakhan and his crew of sky pirates as the main antagonists of the season. It follows the storyline of Nadakhan tricking each of the ninja characters by granting them three wishes and trapping their souls until only Jay and Nya are remaining. In the season finale, the entire events of the season are reversed when Jay makes his final wish.

Voice cast

Main 
 Jillian Michaels as Lloyd Garmadon, the Green Ninja
 Vincent Tong as Kai, the red ninja and Elemental Master of Fire
 Michael Adamthwaite as Jay, the blue ninja and Elemental Master of Lightning
 Brent Miller as Zane, the white/titanium ninja and Elemental Master of Ice
 Kirby Morrow as Cole, the black ninja and Elemental Master of Earth
 Kelly Metzger as Nya, the Elemental Master of Water and Kai's sister
 Paul Dobson as Sensei Wu, the wise teacher of the ninja
Kathleen Barr as Misako
 Scott McNeil as Nadakhan

Supporting 
 Jennifer Hayward as P.I.X.A.L. a female nindroid
Paul Dobson as Flintlocke
Vincent Tong as Doubloon
Nicole Oliver as Dogshank
Ian James Corlett as Clancee
Michael Adamthwaite as Squiffy
Brian Dobson as Bucko
Ian James Corlett as Monkey Wretch
Scott McNeil as Clouse
Brent Miller as Echo Zane
Heather Doerksen as Skylor
Alan Marriott as Captain Soto

Production

Animation 
The animation for the sixth season was produced at Wil Film ApS in Denmark.

Direction 
The episodes for the sixth season were directed by Jens Møller, Michael Helmuth Hansen, and Peter Hausner.

Music 
The season was accompanied by the release of a remixed version of The Weekend Whip, the show's official theme song, which is performed by The Fold. The remixed song is titled The Pirate Whip.

Release 
A video clip providing a first look at the season was shown at the Lego Ninjago panel at San Diego Comic-Con in 2015, which was later released online on the Lego YouTube channel. The Lego Group teased the storyline for the season on 5 November 2015 with the release of the first official poster that depicted the character Jay battling against the season's antagonists, Nadakhan and his crew of sky pirates. An official trailer for the season was released on the Lego YouTube channel on 7 January 2016. The season premiered on Cartoon Network on 24 March 2016. The rest of the season was released throughout June and July 2016, with the season finale titled The Way Back being released on 15 July of the same year.

Plot 
Clouse (who is now a ghost escaped from the Cursed Realm) finds the Teapot of Tyrahn and frees the evil Djinn or Genie Nadakhan. He grants Clouse three wishes, traps him inside the teapot, and then searches for the Realm Crystal to reunite his crew of sky pirates. When he discovers that the ninja are protecting it, he frames them for various crimes, which results in them becoming wanted criminals. The ninja split up to escape but Nadakhan imprisons Wu and Misako in the teapot. Nadakhan finds the Realm Crystal in the Hiroshi Labyrinth Stronghold. In Kryptarium Prison, the ninja meet Captain Soto, who explains that they must use a drop of Tiger Widow venom to weaken Nadakhan, so they head for the location of the last Tiger Widow spider. Nadakhan frees his crew from across the Sixteen Realms and they repair the Misfortune's Keep. They visit his home realm and kingdom, Djinjago and discover that it is deteriorating, caused by the ninja destroying the Cursed Realm. Khanjkhan gives Nadakhan the Djinn Blade, which Nadakhan uses to slash the Teapot of Tyrahn, causing the souls of Clouse, Wu, and Misako to transfer into the sword. He returns to Ninjago and swears revenge on the ninja.

Nadakhan tricks Jay into making his first wish. To impress Nya, Jay wishes he was rich and was never born in a junkyard and, as a result, discovers that he was adopted and that his real father is Cliff Gordon, a famous actor. Nadakhan then traps Kai and Zane in his sword. He begins his plan to create New Djinjago by raising pieces of Ninjago into the sky. The ninja reach Tiger Widow Island  and Jay extracts the venom. He is imprisoned on Misfortune's Keep. Nadakhan reveals his plan to wed Nya (who resembles his lost love Delara), which will give him the power of infinite wishes. Lloyd, Jay, Cole and Nya are captured by the sky pirates and they waste their remaining wishes in combat, aside from Jay, who still has one wish remaining. Nadakhan traps Lloyd and Cole inside the sword, leaving only Jay and Nya, who escape by creating a fusion dragon of water and lightning. In their last stand against the sky pirates, Nya pushes Jay into a portal and is captured.

Jay gathers allies and they reach New Djinjago on a rising piece of land. He obtains the Djinn Blade and is struck with it to be transported into the blade to release the Ninja, Wu and Misako. Meanwhile, the wedding ceremony is completed and Nadakhan becomes all powerful with the ability of infinite wishes. In the ensuing battle, Flintlocke shoots Nadakhan with the venom, but Nya is also hit and dies in Jay's arms. Jay makes a final wish that the Teapot of Tyrahn had never been found. As a result, Nadakhan is forced to grant Jay his final wish, which causes the entire season's events to be reversed. Only Jay and Nya remember these events and they embrace. In this timeline, Clouse still finds the teapot, but is chased away by locals, ensuring that Nadakhan is never released again.

Episodes

Reception

Ratings 
On 24 March 2016, the season premier for Skybound aired and achieved rank 28 in the Top 50 Original Cable Telecasts, with 0.98 million viewers.

Critical reception 
Reviewer Melissa Camacho for Common Sense Media gave Skybound a 3 out of 5 star rating and noted that the season "offers lots of adventure and some positive messages." The reviewer also commented, "This entertaining series offers a fun, action-packed story while staying true to the Spinjitzu saga. The teen ninja do what most teenagers do, including engaging in competitive behavior and struggling through (largely innocent) romantic entanglements. But they continue to fight for good while recognizing the importance of honor, teamwork, loyalty, and treating everyone in the group equally, regardless of gender." Dave Trumbore for Collider gave the season a four star rating and opined that it is "a fun romp through the mythology in the modern era that emphasizes teamwork, cooperation, and loyalty throughout, all while providing a highly entertaining and action-packed series". RJ Carter for Critical Blast gave the season a 4 out of 5 rating and commented, "This sixth season of Ninjago has quite a bit of action and high drama in it. Yes, there's still a lot of humor that's at a kid level, but I was surprised by how much more there was to it than that. This was a compelling story that grabs the viewer. If you're a grown-up watching this through - because you've simply got to find out how it ends!"

Other media 
An app game titled Ninjago: Skybound was released to accompany the season. It is a side-scrolling platform game for Android devices. The plot involves playing as the main ninja character Jay to stop Nadakhan and his Sky Pirates from stealing parts of Ninjago and rebuilding his realm.

Six mini-movies titled Tall Tales that focus on the Sky Pirates were released in February, March and April 2016 on the Lego YouTube channel to accompany the season. The titles of the mini-movies were Tall Tale of Monkey Wretch, The Tall Tale of Flintlocke, The Tall Tale of Clancee, Tall Tale of Dogshank, The Tall Tale of Doubloon and The Tall Tale of Sqiffy & Bucko.

See also 

 Lloyd Garmadon

References

Primary

Secondary 

Skybound
2016 Canadian television seasons
2016 Danish television seasons